Gumniska  is a village in the administrative district of Gmina Dębica, within Dębica County, Subcarpathian Voivodeship, in south-eastern Poland. It is located within the historic region of Lesser Poland.

The village has a population of 1,200.

Polish sculptor  was born in Gumniska.

References

Gówniska